"Bowling Green" is a 1967 single by The Everly Brothers and was written by Terry Slater and Jacqueline Ertel; Slater was the duo's bass player.

Background
The song is about Bowling Green, Kentucky, which is about an hour's drive from Central City, Ky., where Don Everly was born. The song features a wind ensemble, and the Everly Brothers imitate the sounds of country guitars by singing "Ching" repeatedly.

This is not the traditional song "I Wish I Was In Bowling Green", also known as "Bowling Green", recorded by Cousin Emmy, the Weavers, the Kossoy Sisters and others.

Chart performance
The song peaked at #40 on the Billboard Hot 100 on July 8, 1967. Outside the US, "Bowling Green" reached No. 1 on the Canadian charts. It was the last time the Everly Brothers cracked the Hot 100 until 1984.

Notes and references

External links
 
 LP Discography: Glen Campbell – Gentle On My Mind – Bowling Green

1967 singles
1967 songs
The Everly Brothers songs
Glen Campbell songs
Songs about Kentucky
Song recordings produced by Dick Glasser